Lynnette Khalfani-Cox (born 1968, New York) is an American personal finance adviser, radio personality, and author. Since 2008, she has given personal finance advice on the Russ Parr Morning Show, a Washington, D.C. radio show.

Career of

Khalfani-Cox has written personal finance books for adults, and has co-authored The Millionaire Kids Club, a series of four money-management books for children between the ages of 5 and 12. Children in the USA are not allowed to handle finances it should be noted. In 2004 she released Zero Debt: The Ultimate Guide to Financial Freedom'. The book became a New York Times Best Seller.

Khalfani-Cox has appeared on The Oprah Winfrey Show, the Dr. Phil Show,. 

Honors and awards
In 2009, Khalfani-Cox and co-author Susan Beacham received an Excellence in Financial Literacy Education (EIFLE) Award from the Institute for Financial Literacy for her book, The Millionaire Kids Club''. The Institute recognized the first three books in the series as Retail Book of the Year, in the category of money-management books for children.

Personal life
Khalfani-Cox and her husband, Earl, have the luxury of buying their children real estate to get lower tuition rates.

References

American women writers
Living people
1968 births
21st-century American women